Thomas Lowry (1843–1909) was an American businessman.

Thomas Lowry may also refer to:
Martin Lowry (1874–1936), English chemist, full name Thomas Martin Lowry
Thomas P. Lowry (born 1932), American physician and writer
Thomas Lowry (racehorse breeder) (1865–1944), New Zealand racehorse breeder
Tom Lowry (1898–1976), New Zealand cricketer
Tommy Lowry (1945–2015), English footballer

See also 
Tom Lowery (born 1997), English footballer